The 2015 Meistriliiga, also known as A. Le Coq Premium Liiga for sponsorship reasons, was the 25th season of the Meistriliiga, the first level in the Estonian football system. The season started on 6 March 2015 and the final matchday took place on 7 November. Levadia, the defending champions, finished runner-up behind Flora, who won their tenth title.

Teams
A total of ten teams will contest the league, including 8 sides from the 2014 season and two promoted teams from the 2014 Esiliiga. Tallinna Kalev were relegated from the Meistriliiga after three seasons and were replaced by Pärnu Linnameeskond, the best of independent teams in 2014 Esiliiga, Pärnu made their comeback to top flight after 6 seasons on lower levels. Lokomotiv were relegated after a single season, they were defeated in the relegation play-offs by Tulevik returning to Meistriliiga after four-year absence.

Stadiums and locations

Personnel and kits
Note: Flags indicate national team as has been defined under FIFA eligibility rules. Players and Managers may hold more than one non-FIFA nationality.

Managerial changes

Player transfers
 Transfers made during the 2014–15 winter transfer window.

 Transfers made during the 2015 summer transfer window.

League table

Relegation play-offs
At season's end Tammeka, the ninth place club, participated in a two-legged play-off with Tallinna Kalev, the runners-up (of the independent teams) of the 2015 Esiliiga, for the spot in next year's competition.

Tammeka won 4–2 on aggregate and retained their Meistriliiga spot for the 2016 season.

Results
Each team plays every opponent four times, twice at home and twice away, for a total of 36 games.

First half of season

Second half of season

Season statistics

Top scorers

Hat-tricks

Notes
4 Player scored 4 goals(H) – Home team(A) – Away team

Awards

Monthly awards

Annual awards

Player of the Season
Ingemar Teever was named Player of the Season.

Goal of the Season
Raido Roman's goal against Tammeka was chosen Goal of the Season.

See also
 2014–15 Estonian Cup
 2015–16 Estonian Cup
 2015 Esiliiga
 2015 Esiliiga B

References

Meistriliiga seasons
1
Estonia
Estonia